Ernest George Wilkins (27 October 1919 – January 1999) was a professional footballer and had 4 footballing sons, including the England International Ray Wilkins.

George Wilkins was born in Hackney, East London. While working as a lorry boy, Wilkins played football for Hayes. In 1938 he signed as a professional for Brentford. After making his First Division debut in January 1939 he played three League games before the Second World War. He continued to play for Brentford during the war, including at Wembley in the 1942 London Cup Final, when Brentford beat Portsmouth. He served in the Royal Kent Regiment. When the war ended, he continued with Brentford but was sold in February 1947 for a fee of £7,000 to Bradford Park Avenue. In the following December he was sold to Nottingham Forest for £7,500. He moved to Leeds in September 1949 but only played 3 games for them. In a career interrupted by the war, he played 83 league games and scored 19 goals for the 4 professional clubs.

In December 1949 he returned to Hayes as a coach. He played in the Kent League for Dover in the 1952–53 season. He was coach 3 times at Hayes until sacked in January 1961, when the players complained of his over-rigorous training methods.

Three of his sons, Graham, Ray and Dean Wilkins, played professional football, with Ray playing 84 times for England. Another son, Stephen, was signed by Chelsea and made one appearance for Brentford, before playing for a number of non-league teams, including Dagenham and Hayes.

He died in Bournemouth, Dorset, in January 1999. He was 79 years old.

Honours 
Brentford
 London War Cup: 1941–42

References

External links
George Wilkins profile, hayesfc.net
George Wilkins profile, ozwhitelufc.net.au.

1919 births
1999 deaths
Footballers from Hackney, London
English footballers
Brentford F.C. players
Bradford (Park Avenue) A.F.C. players
Nottingham Forest F.C. players
Leeds United F.C. players
George
Association footballers not categorized by position
British Army personnel of World War II